Lester B. Pearson Catholic High School (LBP) is an Ottawa Catholic School Board high school. It is located in the neighbourhood of Beacon Hill in the city of Ottawa, Ontario, Canada.

Academic program

LBP offers a variety in their academic program including;

 Business
 Social studies
 The Arts 
 English 
 English as a second language
 French 
 Mathematics
 Physical education 
 Health
 Science
 Student services
 and religion throughout all grade levels.

The French program also presents the opportunity to take French immersion or core French.

Clubs and activities 
Lester B. Pearson Catholic High School believes student clubs are essential for student success. Their belief is that students will find enrichment through activities to develop leadership talents. Clubs offered at Lester B. Pearson are listed below:

 Adopt-a-Homeroom
 Ambassadors
 A-V Crew
 Art Club
 Alzheimer's Partnership
 American Sign Language Club
 Backstage Crew
 Best Buddies
 Blood Donors
 Black History Month
 Board Game Club
 Breakfast Club
 Cappies
 Cheerleading
 Concert Band
 Drama – School Play
 GLBTQI2S
 Global Outreach
 Graduation Dance Committee
 Homework Club
 Jazz Ensemble (Sr. & Jr.)
 Jr. and Sr. Band
 Leadership Camp
 Learning Commons -- Red Maple Book Club
 Learning Commons – White Pine Book Club
 ManUP
 Math Contests
 Me to We
 Peer Mentors
 Role Playing Club
 Rosary Club
 School Play
 Science & Math Olympics
 Student Council
 Swim Club
 Variety Show
 Weight Training
 Yearbook
 Youth Ministry

See also 

 Official website 
 List of schools of the Ottawa Catholic School Board

References

150 years of Catholic Education in Ottawa-Carleton 1856-2006, Ottawa-Carleton Catholic School Board, 2006 Archive

Catholic secondary schools in Ontario
High schools in Ottawa
Educational institutions established in 1972
1972 establishments in Ontario
Middle schools in Ottawa